Grüner See is a lake in Hundelshausen, Hesse, Germany.

Lakes of Hesse